Jurassic Express was an American professional wrestling tag team, competing in All Elite Wrestling (AEW). The team consisted of Jungle Boy and Luchasaurus. They are former AEW World Tag Team Champions.

History

All Elite Wrestling (2019–2022) 
Prior to signing with AEW, Jungle Boy and Luchasaurus teamed on the independent circuit, as "A Boy and His Dinosaur". In July 2019, Marko Stunt was added to the team, and the three made their first appearance together at AEW's Fight for the Fallen event, under the name "Jurassic Express". At All Out on August 31, the Jurassic Express was defeated by SoCal Uncensored (Christopher Daniels, Frankie Kazarian and Scorpio Sky) in a six-man tag team match. In October, Jungle Boy and Stunt competed in a tournament to determine the inaugural AEW World Tag Team Champions, but they were eliminated by the Lucha Brothers (Pentagón Jr. and Rey Fénix) in the first round. On the January 15, 2020 episode of Dark, the team obtained its first victory in AEW, after they defeated Strong Hearts (Cima, El Lindaman and T-Hawk). On the February 19 episode of Dynamite, Jungle Boy and Luchasaurus competed in a tag team battle royal to determine the number one contenders for the AEW World Tag Team Championship, but the match was won by The Young Bucks (Matt Jackson and Nick Jackson). On September 5 at All Out, Jungle Boy and Luchasaurus were defeated by The Young Bucks.

At the Revolution event on March 7, 2021, Jungle Boy and Luchasaurus competed in the Casino Tag Team Royale, but were unsuccessful in winning the match. In August 2021, Jungle Boy and Luchasaurus competed in a tag team eliminator tournament to determine the next contender for the tag team championship, but they were defeated by the Lucha Brothers in the finals. On the TBS debut episode of Dynamite on January 5, 2022, Jungle Boy and Luchasaurus would defeat The Lucha Brothers to win their first AEW Tag Team Championship. On the June 15, 2022 edition of Dynamite, Jurassic Express lost the titles to The Young Bucks. Immediately after the match, Christian Cage turned heel and attacked Jungle Boy.

At Blood and Guts two weeks later, Luchasaurus aligned himself with Cage, turning heel and seemingly ending Jurassic Express. However, at Fyter Fest on July 20, 2022, Luchasaurus stepped out of the way and allowed the returning Jungle Boy to chase Cage with a steel chair, apparently reuniting Jurassic Express. 

Finally, at All Out, Luchasaurus attacked Jungle Boy during his entrance for his match with Cage, turning heel once again and officially ending the team.

Championships and accomplishments
All Elite Wrestling
 AEW World Tag Team Championship (1 time) – Jungle Boy and Luchasaurus
 Men's Casino Battle Royale (2021) – Jungle Boy
DDT Pro-Wrestling
Ironman Heavymetalweight Championship (2 times) – Jungle Boy (1) and Marko Stunt (1)
Pro Wrestling Illustrated
Ranked Jungle Boy No. 69 of the top 500 singles wrestlers in the PWI 500 in 2021
Ranked Luchasaurus No. 105 of the top 500 singles wrestlers in the PWI 500 in 2020
Ranked Marko Stunt No. 182 of the top 500 singles wrestlers in the PWI 500 in 2020
Wrestling Observer Newsletter
Rookie of the Year (2019) – Jungle Boy

References

External links 
 Jurassic Express Profile at Cagematch.net
 Jurassic Express Domain Jurassic Express Fan Page.

All Elite Wrestling personnel
All Elite Wrestling teams and stables
Independent promotions teams and stables